The 1888–89 Irish Cup was the ninth edition of the premier knock-out cup competition in Irish football. 

Distillery won the tournament for the fourth time, defeating YMCA 5–4 in the final.

Results

First round

|}

Replay

|}

Second round

|}

Third round

|}

Semi-finals

|}

Final

References

External links
 Northern Ireland Cup Finals. Rec.Sport.Soccer Statistics Foundation (RSSSF)

Irish Cup seasons
1888–89 domestic association football cups
1888–89 in Irish association football